Coprographia is involuntarily making vulgar writings or drawings. Related terms are coprolalia, the involuntary usage of obscene and/or profane words, and copropraxia, the involuntary performance of obscene gestures.

References

Symptoms and signs: Nervous system
Tourette syndrome